9524 O'Rourke, provisionally designated , is an asteroid from the inner regions of the asteroid belt, approximately 3 kilometers in diameter. It was discovered on 2 March 1981, by American astronomer Schelte Bus at the Siding Spring Observatory in New South Wales, Australia. The asteroid was named after Laurence O'Rourke, a researcher at the European Space Astronomy Centre.

Orbit and classification 

O'Rourke orbits the Sun in the inner main-belt at a distance of 1.7–2.7 AU once every 3 years and 3 months (1,190 days). Its orbit has an eccentricity of 0.23 and an inclination of 5° with respect to the ecliptic.

Physical characteristics 

According to the survey carried out by NASA's Wide-field Infrared Survey Explorer with its subsequent NEOWISE mission, the asteroid measures 2.920 kilometers in diameter and its surface has an albedo of 0.273.

As of 2017, O'Rourkes spectral type, as well as its rotation period and shape remain unknown.

Naming 

This minor planet was named after Laurence O'Rourke (born 1970), a researcher at the European Space Astronomy Centre in Madrid, Spain, and a coordinator of ESA's Rosetta mission. The approved naming citation was published by the Minor Planet Center on 12 July 2014.

References

External links 
 Asteroid Lightcurve Database (LCDB), query form (info )
 Dictionary of Minor Planet Names, Google books
 Asteroids and comets rotation curves, CdR – Observatoire de Genève, Raoul Behrend
 Discovery Circumstances: Numbered Minor Planets (5001)-(10000) – Minor Planet Center
 
 

009524
Discoveries by Schelte J. Bus
Named minor planets
19810302